Chevalierella is a genus of African plants in the grass family. The only known species is Chevalierella dewildemanii, native to Republic of Congo and to the Democratic Republic of the Congo.

References

 List of Poaceae genera

Panicoideae
Grasses of Africa
Flora of the Republic of the Congo
Flora of the Democratic Republic of the Congo
Monotypic Poaceae genera
Taxa named by Aimée Antoinette Camus